"I Had a Dream, Joe" is a song by Nick Cave and the Bad Seeds appearing on their 1992 album Henry's Dream. It was released as a single in 1992 by Mute Records.

Formats and track listing 
All songs written by Nick Cave.
UK 7" single (MUTE 148)
 "I Had a Dream, Joe" – 3:42
 "The Good Son" (live) – 4:35

UK 12" single (MUTE 148)
 I Had a Dream, Joe" – 3:43
 "The Carny" (live) – 6:06
 "The Mercy Seat" (live) – 4:40
 "The Ship Song" (live) – 4:19

Personnel
Adapted from the I Had a Dream, Joe liner notes.

Nick Cave and The Bad Seeds
Blixa Bargeld – guitar, backing vocals
Martyn P. Casey – bass guitar, backing vocals
Nick Cave – lead vocals, mixing
Mick Harvey – guitar, organ, backing vocals, mixing
Conway Savage – piano, backing vocals
Thomas Wydler – drums, backing vocals

Production and additional personnel
 David Briggs – production
 Tony Cohen – engineering, mixing
 Peter Milne – photography

Charts

Release history

References

External links 
 

1992 songs
1992 singles
Nick Cave songs
Songs written by Nick Cave
Elektra Records singles
Mute Records singles
Song recordings produced by David Briggs (record producer)